Ahmed Sharif Chaudhry is a two-star General in the Pakistan Army. He is currently serving as the 22nd Director General of ISPR since 6th of December 2022.  He comes from Electrical and Mechanical Engineering(EME) corps.

Military career 
Chaudhry is of EME Corps and previously served as Director General of Defence Science and Technology Organisation previously taking over in January 2020 and replaced Babar Iftikhar. He has attended Pakistan Military Academy, Command and Staff College Quetta, Royal Command and staff college Jordan  and National Defence University, Islamabad.

He is also the first one from Electrical and Mechanical Engineering corps to be appointed as the DG ISPR.

References 

Living people
Pakistani generals
Directors-General of the Inter-Services Public Relations
Year of birth missing (living people)
Pakistan Command and Staff College alumni